Roddi is a comune (municipality) in the Province of Cuneo in the Italian region Piedmont, located about  southeast of Turin and about  northeast of Cuneo.

Roddi borders the following municipalities: Alba, La Morra, Monticello d'Alba, Santa Vittoria d'Alba, and Verduno.

Demographic evolution

References

Cities and towns in Piedmont